Veliefendi Race Course is a horse racing track located at Veliefendi neighborhood in Bakırköy district of Istanbul, Turkey.

It is the country's oldest and biggest race course founded on a former grassland that was historically a farm belonging to Şeyhülislam Veliyüddin Efendi, an 18th-century superior authority of Islam in the Ottoman Empire. The race course was constructed in the years 1912/13 by German specialists upon the initiative of Enver Pasha.

The race course hosts also music events. In 2006, Turkish pop singer Nez held a concert.

Physical attributes
The race course covers an area of  consisting of facilities for racing, training and barns. The race course has three interleaved tracks as:

The track's seating capacity is 7,600. The complex comprises offices, a museum, an exhibition hall, a racehorse hospital, an apprentice training center as well as social and recreational facilities.

Major races
Gazi Race (Gazi Koşusu), is the most prestigious Turkish Oaks, and is held since 1927 in memory of Mustafa Kemal Atatürk, who was awarded the honorific title "Gazi" (Ghazi). Initially run in Ankara, the event was later transferred to Veliefendi Race Course. The award is about TL 1.4 million (approx. US$850,000 as of June 2011), and since 1970 is accompanied with a silver equestrian statue of Atatürk.
Prime Minister's Race (Başbaşkanlık Koşusu) is a Turkish Oaks held since 1951. The winner is awarded TL 1,105,000 (approx. US$330,000 as of July 2018) and a trophy bestowed by the Turkish prime minister.

Incidents
During a race on July 31, 1949, four race horses, including two favourite horses, did not leave the starting gate upon the referee's start sign, and were disqualified. The bettors protested about a possible swindle by the referees and the racehorse owners, and demanded a rerun. As the referee commission rejected the demand, the crowd set the referee tower, the bleachers, the administration and box offices on fire.

In July 1953, bettors throw horsemen with stones and beat a jockey named Muhacir Ahmet (literally: Ahmet The Immigrant) they believed he had swindled. Two years later local newspapers published about swindles at Veliefendi Race Course, and during a race on July 13, 1955, the bettors stoned the administration building, and Muhacir Ahmet was beaten once again.

In 2008, the track held its first-ever farewell ceremony for a racehorse, honoring Ribella, a popular mare.

References

Horse racing venues in Turkey
Sports venues in Istanbul
Music venues in Istanbul
Zeytinburnu
Event venues established in 1913
1913 establishments in the Ottoman Empire